The 2013 Ashes series (known as the Investec 2013 Ashes Series for sponsorship reasons) was a series of Test cricket matches contested between England and Australia for the Ashes. It formed part of the 2013 Australian tour of England, which also included the 2013 ICC Champions Trophy, five One Day Internationals and two Twenty20 Internationals.

The 2013 series was the first of two back-to-back Ashes series. With the intent of breaking the cycle of Ashes series being held directly before Cricket World Cups, the Ashes were brought forward in the schedule by one year, starting with the 2013–14 series in Australia.

England won the series 3–0, with wins at Trent Bridge, Lord's and the Riverside Ground; the matches at Old Trafford and The Oval finished as draws.

Venues
The five venues used in the series were Trent Bridge, Lord's, Old Trafford, the Riverside Ground and The Oval. There were questions as to whether Lord's would host an Ashes match – it would have been the first time since 1882 that Lord's had not hosted an Ashes Test – but the venues were eventually confirmed to include Lord's on 22 September 2011. On 1 June 2012, it was announced that the first Test was scheduled to take place at Trent Bridge.

It was the first Ashes series held in England since 1977 not to include a match at Edgbaston.

Squads

The Australia squad was announced on 24 April 2013. The squad included players for the entire Australian tour of England and Scotland, including the 2013 ICC Champions Trophy, the T20I series against England, and the ODI series against both England and Scotland. Among those selected were 35-year-old opening batsman Chris Rogers, five years after his only other Test cap, and uncapped all-rounder James Faulkner. Despite having played in nine of the last 10 Ashes Tests, seamer Mitchell Johnson was omitted from the squad, as was the highly rated, Pakistan-born leg spinner, Fawad Ahmed, who had not yet received his Australian passport.

All-rounder Steve Smith was added to the squad on 23 June after captain Michael Clarke suffered injury concerns, while left-arm orthodox spinner Ashton Agar was called up as back up for Nathan Lyon after taking six wickets for Australia A in three matches against Scotland, Ireland and Gloucestershire. Having been suspended until the start of the first Test for punching Joe Root on a night out during the Champions Trophy, opening batsman David Warner was sent on the Australia A tour of southern Africa to regain match experience; during the tour, which lasted from 18 to 27 July, Warner remained part of the Australian Ashes squad.

The England squad for the first Test was announced on 6 July 2013, the most notable absentee being batsman Nick Compton, who had opened the batting with captain Alastair Cook in each of the nine Tests since the retirement of former captain Andrew Strauss; Compton was replaced in the opening partnership by 22-year-old Joe Root. Middle-order batsman Kevin Pietersen and spinner Graeme Swann were included after overcoming injury troubles from earlier in the year, while Tim Bresnan, Steven Finn and Graham Onions were all selected as competition for the third seam bowling spot alongside James Anderson and Stuart Broad.

After naming an unchanged squad for the first two Tests, England were forced into a change for the third Test after Pietersen suffered a calf injury on the third day at Lord's. After much speculation regarding his replacement, Nottinghamshire batsman James Taylor was called up on the back of an unbeaten century against the Australians in a tour match against Sussex, for whom he was making a guest appearance. The England selectors also made the decision to allow Finn and Onions to return to their clubs, to be replaced by seamer Chris Tremlett and another spin option in Monty Panesar. Following the fourth Test at Chester-le-Street, Tim Bresnan was ruled out for the summer, so Simon Kerrigan and Chris Woakes were given surprise call-ups and would both go on to make their debuts in the fifth Test at The Oval.

† Late addition to squad

Matches

First Test

The first Test was noted as a dramatic match with the advantage swinging between the two sides, culminating in a close result. England's opening innings of 215 all out was considered disappointing, however Australia seemed to be heading to a significant deficit after being reduced to 117/9 in the following innings. The record-breaking 10th-wicket stand revived the tourists to an unexpected 65-run lead by the end of the innings. England reclaimed the upper hand in the third innings, with Ian Bell's century contributing to a total of 375, setting Australia a target of 311 to win the Test. England looked to be in a strong position, as there had been only 10 recorded successful fourth-innings run chases of over 300 in Test history. However, Australia had a strong showing with the bat and were only 15 runs short of victory by the time the final partnership was broken in the afternoon session of the fifth day.

Second Test

In comparison to the close first Test, the second match of the series was a much easier victory for England. Though losing their first three wickets for just 28 runs England managed 361 by the time their final wicket fell in the morning session on day two. Australia only managed a response of 128, their lowest total at Lord's since 1968, with the second innings ending before the end of the day's play. With a lead of over 200 runs, England captain Alastair Cook had the option of making the Australians follow-on, but elected not to. In the third innings, Australia managed to reduce England to 30/3, but from then on, England were dominant, with Joe Root scoring 180 in 338 balls and 466 minutes at the crease. Immediately following Root's dismissal early on the fourth day, Cook declared at 349/7. England managed to dismiss Australia before the end of the day's play, securing a 2–0 lead in the series.

Third Test

England went into the third Test needing only a draw to retain the Ashes. In the opening innings the English bowlers were ineffective against the Australian batsmen, with captain Michael Clarke scoring 187 runs. Australia ended up batting for most of the first two days before declaring on 527/7. England's second innings batting response was slow, scoring 368 all out at an average run rate of just 2.63 runs per over. However England critically managed to avoid the follow-on and consumed much of the time remaining in the game; Australia began the third innings shortly before lunch on the fourth day. Australia quickly scored 172 runs at a run rate of 4.77 runs per over, and elected to declare overnight, hoping to bowl England out on the final day to win the game. However rain and poor light meant that only 20 overs were played. With the match declared a draw England retained the Ashes.

Fourth Test

Having already at least drawn the series, England's first innings was slow with an average run rate of only 2.58 per over. England managed to hit 149/2 before succumbing to a run total of 238 early on the second day of the test. Australia's response was marginally better, with Chris Rogers hitting a century to contribute to his team's 270-run innings despite bad light. In the third innings, Australia were unable to prevent Ian Bell from securing his third century of the series by the close of the third day. England made 330 all-out, leaving a target of 299. In the fourth innings, England dismissed Australia for 224 by the end of the fourth day to secure an unassailable 3–0 lead in the series.

Fifth Test

Australia started strongly with both Shane Watson and Steven Smith hitting centuries in their first innings. Australia captain Michael Clarke opted to declare for 492/9 on the second day of the test. As in the previous test, England's first innings was slow with an average run rate of 2.6 per over. With rain forcing play to be abandoned on the fourth day, England managed to push to 377 all out just after lunch on the fifth day. Australia added 111/6 in less than two hours before declaring, setting England a target of 227 from 44 overs; the run chase ended in a draw when play was called off due to bad light at 7:36pm, with England needing 21 runs from the final four overs. The umpires' decision to end the game early was controversial, with commentator Jonathan Agnew declaring it an "absolute disgrace".

Statistics

Individual

Brad Haddin's 29 dismissals in the series (all caught) set a new record for the most dismissals by a wicketkeeper in a Test series.

Team

Decision Review System

The implementation of DRS in this series resulted in several controversies, mostly relating to the use of the Hot Spot technology. The most high-profile occurred in the first innings of the third Test: Usman Khawaja was given out caught-behind by on-field umpire Tony Hill, and reviewed the decision; Hot Spot showed no sign of an edge, and many observers noted that visual evidence also appeared to show that Khawaja did not edge the ball, but the decision was not overturned. Cricket Australia requested a formal explanation of the decision from the ICC following the match, and the decision was heavily criticised in Australian media. Kevin Pietersen was dismissed in similar circumstances in the second innings of the same match.

After the third Test, allegations were made by Australian broadcaster Channel Nine that batsmen were trying to avoid Hot Spot detections by applying silicone tape to their bats. While such a practice would have been technically legal under the laws of cricket, Kevin Pietersen, who was specifically named in the claims, angrily denied the allegations, and the ICC did not investigate the claims. In October 2013, Pietersen won libel damages from Specsavers after they ran an advert that implied that he had tampered with his bat.

Broadcasters
The Australian live television rights to the series were shared by the Nine Network and Fox Sports, and the British rights by Sky Sports with daily highlights broadcast on Channel 5. Live radio commentary in the UK was provided by BBC Test Match Special, which was syndicated on ABC Radio Grandstand in Australia.

See also
Ashes Cricket 2013, a video game

Notes

References

External links
 Australia in England – The Ashes on ESPN Cricinfo

Ashes Series, 2013
International cricket competitions in 2013
2013